() is a station on Line 12 of the Paris Métro in the 7th arrondissement, named after the nearby National Assembly.

The station opened on 5 November 1910 as part of the original section of the Nord-Sud Company's Line A between Porte de Versailles and Notre-Dame-de-Lorette. On 27 March 1931, Line A became Line 12 of the Métro. It was called  ("Chamber of Deputies"), the former name of the National Assembly, until 1989.

Station layout

Gallery

References
Roland, Gérard (2003). Stations de métro. D’Abbesses à Wagram. Éditions Bonneton.

Paris Métro stations in the 7th arrondissement of Paris
Railway stations in France opened in 1910